Iowa Highway 224 (Iowa 224) is a state highway in central Iowa. It intersects U.S. Highway 6 (US 6) near Kellogg. The highway, in conjunction with Iowa 14, is the most direct route from I-80 to Marshalltown.

Route description
Iowa 224 begins at a diamond interchange along I-80. From I-80, Iowa 224 travels north  to an intersection with US 6 just south of Kellogg. On the southern edge of Kellogg, it crosses the North Skunk River and a line of the Iowa Interstate Railroad. Iowa 224 represents the eastern boundary of Kellogg as the vast majority of the town is to the west. It follows this west-leading stretch of highway until its end at Iowa Highway 14.

Iowa 224 to Iowa 14 is the most direct route to Marshalltown from westbound I-80.  By avoiding Newton, where I-80 meets Iowa 14, drivers can save .

History
Iowa 224 began as a short spur route connecting Kellogg to US 6.  It remained a short spur until 1980, when it was extended along CR T22 south to I-80, and north to CR F17, where it turned west to connect to Iowa 14.  These changes first appeared on the 1981 state map published by the Iowa Department of Transportation.

Major intersections

References

224